Culcasia is a genus of flowering plants in the family Araceae, native to tropical Africa. Most of its species are climbers and resemble Cercestis, except that they do not produce flagella.

Species
Culcasia angolensis Welw. ex Schott - western + central Africa from Senegal to Angola
Culcasia annetii Ntépé-Nyamè - Ivory Coast, Cameroon, Liberia
Culcasia bosii Ntépé-Nyamè - Cameroon, Gabon, Congo-Brazzaville
Culcasia brevipetiolata Bogner - Gabon
Culcasia caudata Engl.  - Zaïre
Culcasia dinklagei Engl - western + central Africa from Liberia to Zaïre
Culcasia ekongoloi Ntépé-Nyamè - central Africa from Nigeria to Zaïre
Culcasia falcifolia Engl. - central Africa from Gabon east to Tanzania and south to Mozambique
Culcasia glandulosa Hepper - Ivory Coast, Sierra Leone, Liberia, Congo-Brazzaville 
Culcasia insulana N.E.Br. - Zaïre, Cameroon, Gulf of Guinea Islands
Culcasia lanceolata Engl. - Cameroon, Gabon
Culcasia liberica N.E.Br. - Ivory Coast, Sierra Leone, Liberia, Togo
Culcasia linearifolia Bogner - Cameroon, Gabon
Culcasia loukandensis Pellegr - Cameroon, Gabon, Congo-Brazzaville, Zaïre, Central African Republic
Culcasia mannii (Hook.f.) Engl.  - Cameroon, Gabon, Congo-Brazzaville, Nigeria, Equatorial Guinea
Culcasia obliquifolia Engl. - Cameroon, Gabon
Culcasia orientalis Mayo - Kenya, Tanzania, Mozambique, Zambia
Culcasia panduriformis Engl. & K.Krause - Cameroon, Gabon
Culcasia parviflora N.E.Br. - western + central Africa from Liberia to Zaïre
Culcasia rotundifolia Bogner - Gabon
Culcasia sanagensis Ntépé-Nyamè - Cameroon
Culcasia scandens P.Beauv. - western + central Africa from Liberia to Angola
Culcasia seretii De Wild - western + central Africa from Liberia to Zaïre
Culcasia simiarum Ntépé-Nyamè - western Africa from Ivory Coast to Cameroon
Culcasia striolata Engl. - western + central Africa from Liberia to Congo-Brazzaville 
Culcasia tenuifolia Engl. - western + central Africa from Liberia to Zaïre
Culcasia yangambiensis Louis & Mullend. - Congo-Brazzaville, Zaïre

References

Aroideae
Araceae genera
Flora of Africa